Kim Sung-min (Hangul: 김성민; born  in Incheon) is a South Korean male volleyball player. He currently plays for the Incheon Korean Air Jumbos in the V-League.

Career

Clubs
After finishing a successful college volleyball career at Inha University, where he was recognized as the top collegiate spiker in the country,  Kim was eligible for the V-League draft. He was selected by the Korean Air Jumbos with the fourth pick of the first round in the 2016 V-League Draft.

National team
As a junior at Inha University in  2015, Kim was selected for the South Korean collegiate national team to participate in the 2015 Asian U23 Championship, the 2015 FIVB U23 World Championship and the 2015 Summer Universiade.

External links
 Kim Sung-min at the International Volleyball Federation (FIVB)

1994 births
Living people
South Korean men's volleyball players
Sportspeople from Incheon
21st-century South Korean people